Hale Township may refer to:

 Hale Township, Garland County, Arkansas, in Garland County, Arkansas
 Hale Township, Warren County, Illinois
 Hale Township, Jones County, Iowa
 Hale Township, McLeod County, Minnesota
 Hale Township, Hardin County, Ohio

Township name disambiguation pages